Hill Lake Township is a township in Aitkin County, Minnesota, United States. The population was 430 as of the 2010 census.

Geography

The city of Hill City lies within the township but is a separate entity.

Major highways
  U.S. Highway 169
  Minnesota State Highway 200

Lakes
 Bible Lake
 Chamberlin Lake
 Hill Lake (vast majority)
 Previs Lake

Adjacent townships
 Wildwood Township, Itasca County (northeast)
 Macville Township (south)
 Spang Township, Itasca County (northwest)

Cemeteries
The township contains Hill Lake Cemetery.

Demographics
As of the census of 2000, there were 447 people, 167 households, and 121 families residing in the township.  The population density was 13.4 people per square mile (5.2/km2).  There were 296 housing units at an average density of 8.9/sq mi (3.4/km2).  The racial makeup of the township was 96.64% White, 0.22% African American, 1.12% Native American, and 2.01% from two or more races. Hispanic or Latino of any race were 0.22% of the population.

There were 167 households, out of which 29.9% had children under the age of 18 living with them, 65.3% were married couples living together, 4.2% had a female householder with no husband present, and 27.5% were non-families. 19.8% of all households were made up of individuals, and 6.6% had someone living alone who was 65 years of age or older.  The average household size was 2.68 and the average family size was 3.10.

In the township the population was spread out, with 27.1% under the age of 18, 6.7% from 18 to 24, 28.0% from 25 to 44, 25.7% from 45 to 64, and 12.5% who were 65 years of age or older.  The median age was 38 years. For every 100 females, there were 101.4 males.  For every 100 females age 18 and over, there were 106.3 males.

The median income for a household in the township was $40,000, and the median income for a family was $47,250. Males had a median income of $31,250 versus $21,250 for females. The per capita income for the township was $16,915.  About 3.1% of families and 5.4% of the population were below the poverty line, including 4.2% of those under age 18 and 5.4% of those age 65 or over.

References
 United States National Atlas
 United States Census Bureau 2007 TIGER/Line Shapefiles
 United States Board on Geographic Names (GNIS)

Townships in Aitkin County, Minnesota
Townships in Minnesota